Mahsa Amrabadi (born July 3, 1984 in Rasht, Gilan) is an Iranian journalist.

Amrabadi, along with her husband and reformist journalist Masoud Bastani, were arrested after the disputed presidential election of June 2009. She was sentenced to 2 years in prison. She was released from prison in 2013.

See also
 Human rights in Iran

References

External links
 News on Mahsa Amrabadi

Iranian journalists
Iranian prisoners and detainees
1984 births
Living people